Richard Trench may refer to:

Richard Trench (politician) (1710–1768), Irish MP for Banagher and Galway County
Richard Trench, 2nd Earl of Clancarty (1767–1837), his grandson, Dutch noble, Irish and British MP, diplomat
Richard Trench, 4th Earl of Clancarty (1834–1891), Irish peer and Dutch noble
Richard Chenevix Trench (1807–1886), Irish poet and Archbishop of Dublin